Celsing is a surname. Notable people with the surname include:

 Elsa Celsing (1880–1974), Swedish artist also known as Elsa Backlund-Celsing
 Lars von Celsing (1916–2009), Swedish diplomat
 Peter Celsing (1920–1974), Swedish modernist architect